72 Motorised Brigade was a Formation of 7th Infantry Division (South Africa), a combined arms force consisting of infantry, armour and artillery.

History

Origin

18 Brigade
72 Brigade can trace its origins back to a structure in the late 1960s, called 18 Brigade, which was headquartered in Kensington.
On 1 August 1974, through a reorganization of the Army’s conventional force, the name was changed to 72 Motorised Brigade.

Initial Structure
Under this reorganisation, the following units were transferred from Witwatersrand Command to the new command:
Transvaal Scottish Regiment, 1st Battalion
South African Irish Regiment,
Johannesburg Regiment,
1 Light Horse Regiment,
Transvaal Horse Artillery,
12 Field Squadron,
72 Signal Squadron,
7 Maintenance Unit,
31 Field Workshop and
5 Field Ambulance.

Higher Command
During its period 72 Motorised Brigade resorted at different stages under the 7 and 8 Divisions.

Brigade Training and Exercises 
72 Motorised Brigade would generally make use of the General de Wet Training Range, Tempe, near Bloemfontein. Notably 72 Motorised Brigade was involved in Exercise Thunder Chariot, a Divisional exercise held since 1956, at the Army Battle School. Other exercises included:
Exercise de Wet 2 in April and May 1975
Exercise Quicksilver in May 1978 in the Kimberly-Schmidtsdrift-Douglas area
Exercise Eagle Hill 1 in April 1979 at Lohatla

Operational Activation
As a Citizen Force structure, 72 Motorised Brigade would make use of call-up orders for its personnel to generally report for 3 months service. Headquarters staff would then leave for Tempe near Bloemfontein, where a transfer camp would be established to process troops en route to the operational area in northern South West Africa. Processing of units would include personal documentation, a medical examination, inoculation and the issuing of equipment and weapons. Each unit on completion of the necessary processing, would entrain to the Olienhoutplaat Station for a six-day journey to Grootfontein, the railhead near the Operational Area.

South West Africa and Angola 
In January 1976 72 Motorised Brigade was mobilised mainly to protect the Ruacana/Caluque Water scheme in the Cunene River. Colonel S.W.J. Kotze took control of the Brigade at that stage.  On 27 March 1976, the formation returned from Angola.

The rear headquarters
By 1978, the Brigade took over 1 Mobilisation Centre in Pretoria as its Rear Headquarters.

73375198 PE
72 Motorised Brigade received the Freedom of Johannesburg on 16 February 1980.

Insignia

Leadership 
Brigadier S.J. Terblanche 1974
Colonel S.W.J. Kotze 1976- 1980
Colonel E. Webb 1980

See also

Notes

References

External links

Brigades of South Africa
Disbanded military units and formations in Johannesburg
Military units and formations established in 1974
Military units and formations of South Africa in the Border War
Military units and formations disestablished in 1992